Here is a list of Missouri's congressional districts ranked by their Human Development Index.

Very high

1. CD 2 - 0.944

2. CD 1 - 0.921

 Missouri state average - 0.918

3. CD 3 - 0.915

4. CD 5 - 0.908

High

5. CD 6 - 0.891

6. CD 9 - 0.888

7. CD 7 - 0.883

8. CD 4 - 0.875

9. CD 8 - 0.856

References